The Bohemian Prater is a small amusement park at the edge of Vienna. It dates to the second half of the 19th century, and some of the rides are more than 100 years old. The name is derived from the larger Wiener (Viennese) Prater.

On 11 December 1944, during World War II, the Bohemian Prater was almost completely destroyed by a bomb attack.

The centre of the Bohemian Prater forms the meeting centre Tivoli.

History 
In the 19th century, workers mostly spent their meager free time in inns. Excursions and walks were the only entertainment. Since the second half of the 19th century, the Laa Forest has been one of the most popular destinations for excursions and can be reached on foot in around 15 minutes from Favoriten.

Franz Bauer, a canteen manager at the Laaer Wald brickworks, ran a small inn here, which soon became a popular destination for Sunday excursions for the so-called "Ziegelboehm", the workers of the Vienna brickworks who mainly came from Bohemia and Moravia. In 1882, Franz Bauer applied for permission to hold games next to his inn and set up a swing and a merry-go-round.

A little later, an innkeeper opened another excursion inn on the Laaer Berg. In 1884, 20 restaurants and numerous showmen had already settled in the Laaer Wald, which formed the basis of the small Prater and was soon given the name "BÖHMISCHER PRATER" because of its visitors. It soon became the most important place of entertainment for the people of Favoritner and Simmering.

Ferris wheel
As with the large Prater in Vienna, there is a Ferris wheel.

References

Amusement parks in Austria
Tourist attractions in Vienna
Buildings and structures in Vienna